Nazilli is the largest town in Aydın Province in the Aegean region of western Turkey,  east of the city of Aydın, on the road to Denizli.

Etymology 
Nazilli is a Turkish name that has somehow evolved from the former (also Turkish) name of Pazarköy (marketplace). According to legend, the son of Aydın's governor in the Ottoman period, fell in love with a young woman from Pazarköy but was rejected by the girl's father. The young man later named the town Nazlı Ili (Nazlı's Home) after his loved one. The 17th century traveller Evliya Çelebi held that the town was named for the capriciousness ("naz") of the local women in this wealthy town. Or it could have been the name of a family of Oghuz Turks that settled here.

Nazilli was still called Nazli by the British as of 1920.

History 

These people practiced weaving and thus planted cotton in the area for this purpose. The Oghuz Turks were succeeded by the Anatolian beyliks of Menteşe (in 1280) and then Aydinids.

In 1390 Bayezid I brought the area into the Ottoman Empire. At this time, the town comprised two villages, Cuma Yeri (Friday Square) and Pazarköy (Weekday Market). The town was only later referred to as Nazliköy. In 1402 Timur defeated Bayezid at the Battle of Ankara and took control of the Aegean region, expelling the Knights Hospitaller and giving the Nazilli area back to the Aydinid family. It was quickly recovered for the Ottomans by Sultan Murad II.

From 1867 until 1922, Nazilli was part of the Aidin Vilayet of the Ottoman Empire. During the Turkish War of Independence, Nazilli was occupied by the Greek Army and came under Turkish control on September 5, 1922.

Geography 
Nazilli stands on the Menderes River and much of the district is in the Menderes valley, full of citrus trees, olives and figs as well as cotton, wheat and other crops.

Economy

Historically, Nazilli was a producer of lignite. As of 1914, they were producing large quantities which were managed by a company from the United States. The lignite, in 1920, was described as being "deplorably bad," despite demand for it to be exported to Smyrna. Just north of Nazilli, in 1920, were reported emery mines, too.Nazilli has also been renowned for being an important dried fig producer towns of Anatolia. Petros Mengos, a Greek from Kokluca village in Smyrna, who volunteered to fight in the Greek Revolution stated that "The best figs exported from Smyrna are brought on camels, from a province sixty miles interior, called Naslée, or in Greek Ilioupolis."

Points of Interest
 Arpaz Castle, also known as Arpaz Beyler Mansion.

Contemporary Nazilli
Nazilli today has a population of 156,748 (according to the 2018 census).

The Basmane-Nazilli Regional railway service runs between İzmir and Nazilli.

References

External links 
 Website of the District Governorate
 Nazilli
 Local Information 
 Nazilli otelleri

 
Populated places in Aydın Province
Cities in Turkey
Districts of Aydın Province
Nazilli District